Watson Lake is one of two reservoirs at the Granite Dells, in Prescott, Arizona, that was formed in the early 1900s when the Chino Valley Irrigation District built a dam on Granite Creek. The City of Prescott bought the reservoir and surrounding land in 1997 to preserve it as recreational land.  Local rockclimbers use the granite cliffs above and adjacent to the lake for top-roping and lead climbing. The lake is also the home of TriCity Prep Rowing Crew, a local high school team and only rowing team in Northern Arizona.

Fish species
 Largemouth bass
 Crappie
 Sunfish
 Channel catfish
 Carp
Gila Trout

See also
 List of lakes in Arizona

References

External links
 
 Arizona Boating Locations Facilities Map
 Arizona Fishing Locations Map
 Video of Watson Lake

Prescott, Arizona
Reservoirs in Yavapai County, Arizona
Reservoirs in Arizona